Argyrolepidia is a genus of moths of the family Noctuidae.

Species
 Argyrolepidia aequalis (Walker, [1865])
 Argyrolepidia aethria Turner, 1908
 Argyrolepidia aurea Jordan, 1903
 Argyrolepidia comma Talbot, 1929
 Argyrolepidia concisa Jordan, 1912
 Argyrolepidia fracta (Rothschild, 1899)
 Argyrolepidia goldiei (Druce, 1894)
 Argyrolepidia inconspicua (Rothschild, 1896)
 Argyrolepidia lunaris Rothschild & Jordan, 1905
 Argyrolepidia megisto (Boisduval, 1832)
 Argyrolepidia mutans (Rothschild, 1901)
 Argyrolepidia novaehiberniae (Boisduval, 1832)
 Argyrolepidia palaea Rothschild, 1905
 Argyrolepidia pamphila (Stoll, [1781])
 Argyrolepidia resplendens (Rothschild & Jordan, 1903)
 Argyrolepidia restrictus (Rothschild, 1897)
 Argyrolepidia stevensi Jordan, 1938
 Argyrolepidia thoracophora (Turner, 1920)
 Argyrolepidia unimacula Lower, 1903

References
 Argyrolepidia at Markku Savela's Lepidoptera and Some Other Life Forms
 Natural History Museum Lepidoptera genus database

Agaristinae